Great Bear Lake Airport  is a private aerodrome adjacent to Great Bear Lake, Northwest Territories, Canada. Prior permission is required to land except in the case of an emergency.

See also
 Great Bear Lake Water Aerodrome

References

Airports in the Arctic
Registered aerodromes in the Sahtu Region